Czech cuisine has both influenced and been influenced by the cuisines of surrounding countries and nations. Many of the cakes and pastries that are popular in Central Europe originated within the Czech lands. Contemporary Czech cuisine is more meat-based than in previous periods; the current abundance of farmable meat has enriched its presence in regional cuisine. Traditionally, meat has been reserved for once-weekly consumption, typically on weekends.

The body of Czech meals typically consists of two or more courses; the first course is traditionally soup, the second course is the main dish, and the third course can include supplementary courses, such as dessert or compote. In the Czech cuisine, thick soups and many kinds of sauces, both based on stewed or cooked vegetables and meats, often with cream, as well as baked meats with natural sauces (gravies), are popular dishes usually accompanied with beer, especially Pilsner, that Czechs consume the most in the world. Czech cuisine is also very strong in sweet main courses and desserts, a unique feature in European cuisines.

History
The 19th-century Czech language cookbook  by Karolína Vávrová shows influences of French cuisine in the order of multi-course meals common throughout the Habsburg monarchy, beginning with soup, followed by fish entrees, meat and sweets. Vávrová deviates from this standard order for the sweets of  type. These flour-based sweets, including baked puddings, strudels, doughnuts and souffles could be served either before or after the roast meats, but stewed fruits, creamy desserts, cakes, ice cream, and cookies were to always be served after the roast and for multiple dessert courses would follow this stated order.

Side dishes
Dumplings (steamed and sliced like bread) are one of the mainstays of Czech cuisine and are typically served with meals. They can be either wheat or potato-based and are sometimes made from a combination of wheat flour and dices made of stale bread or rolls. Puffed rice can be found in store-prepared mixtures. Smaller Czech dumplings are usually potato-based. When served as leftovers, sliced dumplings are sometimes pan-fried with eggs. Czech potato dumplings are often filled with smoked meat and served with spinach or sauerkraut. Fried onion and braised cabbage can be included as a side dish.

There are many other side dishes, including noodles and boiled rice. Potatoes are served boiled with salt, often with caraway seed and butter. Peeled and boiled potatoes are mixed into mashed potatoes. New potatoes are sometimes boiled in their skins, not peeled, from harvest time to new year. Because of the influence of foreign countries, potatoes are also fried, so French fries and croquettes are common in restaurants.

Buckwheat, pearl barley and millet grains are rarely served in restaurants. These are more commonly a home-cooked, healthier alternative. Pasta is common, either baked, boiled, cooked with other ingredients, or served as a salad. Pasta is available in different shapes and flavors. This is an influence of Italian and Asian cuisine. Rice and buckwheat noodles are not common but are becoming more popular. Gluten-free pasta is also available, made from corn flour, corn starch, or potatoes.

Breads and pastries
Bread ( or ) is traditionally sourdough baked from rye and wheat, and is flavoured with salt, caraway seeds, onion, garlic, seeds, or pork crackling. It is eaten as an accompaniment to soups and dishes. It is also the material for Czech croutons and for slices of bread fried in a pan on both sides and rubbed with garlic. Rolls, buns, and braided buns are the most common forms of bread eaten for breakfast; these are often topped with poppy seeds and salt or other seeds. It is smeared with egg and sprinkled with poppy seeds before baking, giving it a golden-brown colour.

Soups

Soup (colloquially ) plays an important role in Czech cuisine. Soups commonly found in Czech restaurants are beef, chicken or vegetable broth with noodlesoptionally served with liver or nutmeg dumplings; garlic soup with croutonsoptionally served with minced sausage, raw egg, or cheese; and cabbage soup made from sauerkrautsometimes served with minced sausage.  is a Wallachian variety and contains sour cream, bacon, potatoes, eggs and sausage.

Pea, bean and lentil soups are commonly cooked at home. Potato soup is made from potato, onion, carrot, root parsley and celeriac, spiced with caraway seed, garlic and marjoram. Fish soup made with carp is a traditional Christmas dish.

Other common Czech soups are champignon or other mushroom soup, tomato soup, vegetable soup, onion soup and bread soup (served in a hollowed-out loaf of bread).  is a traditional South Bohemian soup containing water, cream, spices, mushrooms, egg (often a quail's egg), dill and potatoes. It is typical in its thickness, white color and characteristic taste. The main ingredient is mushrooms, which gives it the dish's scent.  is a regional specialty soup made from rye sourdough, mushrooms, caraway and fried onion.

Meat dishes

Traditional Czech dishes are made from animals, birds or fish bred in the surrounding areas.

Pork is the most common meat, making up over half of all meat consumption. Beef, veal and chicken are also popular. Pigs are often a source of meat in the countryside, since pork has a relatively short production time, compared to beef.

 is the meat and offal of pork cut into tiny pieces, filled in a casing and closed with sticks. Meat from the neck, sides, lungs, spleen, and liver are cooked with white pastry, broth, salt, spices, garlic and sometimes onions. , known as Kielbasa in the United States, is a smoked meat sausage-like product made from minced meat. It is spicy and durable.  is a pork meat sausage-like product containing pork blood and pearl barley or pastry pieces.  is a meat or poultry product consisting of little pieces of meat in jelly/aspic from connective tissue boiled into mush, served with onion, vinegar and bread.  is a simple dish made from rather fatty pork meat (head or knuckle). These pieces of lower quality meat are boiled in salted water. Pork cracklings and bacon are also eaten.

In restaurants one can find:
  is a stew usually made from beef, pork or game with onions and spices. It is also traditionally served at home as a pot of  will last for several days. Czech  is not to be confused with Hungarian "", which is a soup more similar to Czech  (a soup).  is the Hungarian equivalent of Czech .
 Roast pork with dumplings and cabbage (colloquially ) is often considered the most typical Czech dish. It consists of cabbage and is either cooked or served pickled. There are different varieties, from sour to sweet. 
 Marinated sirloin ( or simply ;  is the name for both the sauce and the meat (pork side or beef side) used for this dish;  means in cream, and it means that the  sauce is with cream. Braised beef, usually larded, with a  saucea thick sauce of carrot, parsley root, celeriac and sometimes cream.
 Baked mincemeatlater only mincemeat, is a dish made from minced pork meat (beef is also possible). 
 Ham is made from pork or beef, braised, dried or smoked.
 Schnitzel is a Czech meat dish. The word means "sliced/cut (out) piece". These are usually small slices of veal, pork or chicken covered with Czech  'triplecoat', made from putting and pressing a piece pounded and sliced into smooth flour on both sides, then covered in whisked egg and breadcrumbs and fried on both sides.  is served with potato side-dishes. The Czech triplecoat is used in some households at Christmas to cover carp or trout decorated with lemon slices.
  is a burger usually made from pork, beef, minced fish or other meat. It is often mixed with egg and commonly crumbled with Czech triplecoat. It can be vegetable-based with pastry pieces or flour and in both versions fried on both sides or baked.
 Smoked meat with potato dumplings, fried onion and cooked spinach.
 Beef with tomato sauce ( or ) is served with dumplings. Dill sauce ( or ) is often on menus too.
 Rabbit is commonly bred in the countryside. Hare with wild game is also served. Mutton, lamb, kid, boar, horse or deer are not as common.

Commonly-found poultry dishes are:
 Goose, duck, turkey and chicken. Pheasant, partridge, guineafowl, pigeon and other game birds are not as common.
 Roast duck is served with bread or potato dumplings and braised red cabbage. 
 Chicken in paprika sauce or hen in paprika sauce is chicken or hen stewed with onion, paprika and cream. 
 Roast turkey with bacon is turkey larded with, or wrapped in bacon, roasted with bacon and butter; it is not very common.
 Fishmostly trout and carpis commonly eaten at Christmas. Otherwise many fish are imported, including sardines, fillet, salmon, tuna, and anchovy. Other types of fish are slowly becoming popular too. Crayfish used to be very common in rivers, but are nowadays rarer and are protected. Prawns or lobsters are imported instead.

Other dishes

 Mushrooms are often used in Czech cuisine as different types grow in the forests. Czechs make an average of 20 visits to the forest annually, picking up to 20,000 tonnes of mushrooms. Bolete, parasol and other kinds of mushroom are often found. In the shops, you can buy common mushrooms, oyster mushrooms, shiitake, wood ear and dried forest mushrooms.  are shallow-fried mushrooms with onion and spices. Mushroom Jacob is a dish prepared from cooked hulled grain (barley), then strained, mixed with cooked mushrooms, fried onion, garlic, fat and black pepper, and baked in the oven. It is served at Christmas. Mushrooms are often triple-coated and fried. Cauliflower can be fried in the Czech triplecoat.
  (colloquially ) is a fried cheese battered in Czech triplecoat  usually Edam (also Hermelín), about 1 cm thick coated in flour, egg and bread crumbs like Wiener schnitzel, fried and served with tartar sauce and potatoes or french fries.
 Homemade noodles with ground poppy seeds are called ; these are served with powdered sugar and melted butter. A similar dish is potato buns with poppy seeds, and are called cones, because they resemble the cones of coniferous trees.
 Omelettes are often served with peas.
 Pancakes of plate size or palm size are common. 
 The most traditional vegetables are carrots, celery, parsley, turnip, cauliflower, lettuce, onion, leek, garlic, cabbage, kale and chives. In gardens, one can also find tomatoes, bell peppers, courgettes, pumpkins, melons, sunflowers, poppies, potatoes and beet.
 Peas and lentils are, together with bean pods, the most common. They are served as soup or as cooked mash with pickled cucumber and fried onion, occasionally with sausage or smoked meat.  (shoulet) is a mix of boiled peas with barley, fat and other ingredients.
  is a baked dish made with layers of sliced rolls or buns called , sliced apples and milk or eggs. It is served with cinnamon and raisins.
 Semolina porridge is served with sugar, honey, cinnamon or cocoa with butter on the top. Optionally, sliced apples or apricots are added as toppings. Healthier versions substitute semolina for oatmeal or rice.
 Stuffed bell peppers are stuffed with meat or rice with vegetables.
  or lecsó is a stew made from peppers, onions, tomatoes and spices.
 Spaghetti is coming in as an Italian influence.
 Eggs are often used in Czech cuisine because many families outside of cities breed hens. Scrambled eggs are common. Fried eggs (literally "ox eye") are often served with bread or potatoes and spinach. Boiled eggs are also popular. Stuffed eggs are made from halved, shelled, hard-boiled eggs. The yolk is carefully removed into a separate bowl, mixed with salt, mustard and spices and stuffed back. It can be decorated.
 Dairy products have their place in Czech cuisine too. Edam is a Dutch-based type of cheese and Niva is a Czech blue cheese. A common pub food, nakládaný hermelín, or pickled cheese, is a cheese similar to Camembert that is aged in olive oil and spices. Typically served with bread and an assortment of fresh vegetables. Sour cream is commonly used as part of various cream-based sauces.

Snacks

 
They are spiced with marjoram, salt, pepper, and garlic, and usually sized to fit the cooking dish. Smaller variants are often eaten as a side dish.
 , singular  (literally "drowned men"), are piquantly pickled bratwursts in sweet-sour vinegar marinaded with black pepper, bay leaf, onion and chili peppers. They are often available in Czech pubs, but are uncommon in better restaurants.
  is a soft cheese, from the same family as brie and camembert, marinated with peppers and onions in oil. It is a pub-food.
 Beer cheese is a soft cheese, usually mixed with raw onions and mustard, which is spread onto toasted bread. It is also a pub-food.
They may be served with mayonnaise, ham, egg, fish, salads or spreads on the top. All are served in a small amountone mouthful impaled on a stick.
  or "" is an aged cheese with a strong odour. It is made in and sold from Loštice, a small town in Moravia.
 Dried apple chips and dried banana chips.
 Potato, beet and celery chips (crisps) are common snacks.
 Roasted peanuts are common.
 The "Czech hot dog" (also called pikador in South Bohemia) is a street food consisting of boiled or steamed sausage dipped in mustard or ketchup served in a roll with a hole made inside, not in a sliced bun like the common hot dog. It is influenced by German cuisine.
 Langoše (fried bread) are influenced by Hungarian cuisine. They are usually served with garlic, Edam cheese and ketchup, or some combination of the three.

Sweets

Czech coffeehouses are known for their strong coffee, sweet pastries and famous patrons who have included Franz Kafka, Antonín Dvořák, Václav Havel and Albert Einstein. Served warm or cold, strudel (optionally topped with ice cream, whipped cream or powdered sugar), is served at almost every coffee shop, apple being the most common variety. 

Sweets filled with fruit, poppy seed and quark are prevalent and come in diverse forms including cakes,  (pies), tarts, fritters, and dumplings. The tradition of making pies has been preserved in American Czech communities who have settled in the Midwestern United States and Texas. They are laborious to make and usually prepared for special celebrations, births, funerals and they also have a role in Czech wedding traditions where they are distributed to friends and family in place of wedding invitations. The most common fillings are poppy seed, apricots and prunes.

Dough prepared for dumplings may include potatoes, and while the combination of fruits, jams and cheeses varies among households, plums, apricots or strawberries are common. The finished dumplings are boiled and often garnished with butter, poppy seeds or grated cheese, and a sweetener (traditionally dried and powdered pears, but sugar is used in modern adaptations). Also filled with fruit or jam (and sometimes garnished with poppy seeds) are the Czech crepes called . Traditional Czech sponge cake, served most often for breakfast, is made with cream, eggs and sugar and seasonal fruits, especially whole cherries. 

 Sweet dumplings with custard sauce are small pieces of yeast pastry poured with cream made from egg yolks and wine (nowadays is šodó usually replaced with vanilla pidding). The recipe comes from Czech roots, however, the bordering countriesmainly Slovakia, Poland, and Hungaryconsider  as food that came from their country.
 Pudding is a flavoured custard combined in layers.  is served in a glass topped with fruit or shaped in a mould.

 Easter Lamb is prepared for Easter. The dough is from eggs, sugar and flour. Lemons can be added. It is baked in a mould in the shape of a lamb. It can be decorated.
  is from dough similar to that used for Easter Lamb, often with cocoa dough in the middle. It is round, 10–15 cm high, made in a mould and is often served with coffee.
  are smaller types of pancakes prepared with yeast in the batter. They are eaten with jam or warm forest fruits.
  and see List of doughnut varieties.
  is made in two ways:
 Like gingerbread, but without ginger and with added honey. Gingerbread cookies are decorated with shapes; popular themes are heart shapes, three-dimensional cottages and even whole decorated villages are madeespecially in the Pardubice Region where the tradition was established in the 16th century.

 Like a cake with cinnamon and honey.
  is a sponge cake roulade filled with jam.
  (poured)  is a pancake-like batter poured onto a baking sheet. Pieces of fruitapples, pears or cherriesmeasuring 1x2 cm are spread on it and it is then sprinkled with sugar. 
  is a sponge cake with ground poppy seeds.
  is a sponge cake with grated carrots and mrkvánky are small turovers filled with plum or pear jam and with grated carrot added to the dough
  is a treat made out of frozen curd; it is popular with children and has been produced since 1961.

Beverages

The Czech Republic has the highest per-capita consumption of beer in the world. The most common style, which originated here, is Pilsner. Aside from beer, Czechs also produce wine mostly in the region of Moravia and a unique liquors Becherovka. Czech Slivovitz and other pálenka (fruit brandies) is traditionally distilled in the country and are considered national drink. More recently new drinks became popular, among them Tuzemák, traditionally marketed as "Czech rum", is made from potatoes or sugar beets. Another popular mixed drink is Fernet Stock mixed with tonic, called "" or "" (literally "Bavarian beer"). Kofola is a non-alcoholic Czech soft drink somewhat similar in look and taste to Coca-Cola, but not as sweet. Kofola was invented in Communist Czechoslovakia as a substitute to the Coca-Cola that they would not import, but it became so popular that production has continued well past the end of Communism in the country.

See also

 Beer in the Czech Republic
 Moravian cuisine
 Slovak cuisine
 Polish cuisine
 Austrian cuisine
 German cuisine
 Zelný trh

References

External links

Cooking Czech - Czech Recipes for North American Kitchens
Czech cuisine, Typical Czech specialties
The Communist Cookbook That Defined Prague’s Cuisine
Czech Gastronomy
Czech cuisine
Czech traditional food